Baltimore Penn Station, formally named Baltimore Pennsylvania Station in full, is the main inter-city passenger rail hub in Baltimore, Maryland. Designed by New York architect Kenneth MacKenzie Murchison (1872–1938), it was constructed in 1911 in the Beaux-Arts style of architecture for the Pennsylvania Railroad. It is located at 1515 N. Charles Street, about a mile and a half north of downtown and the Inner Harbor, between the Mount Vernon neighborhood to the south, and Station North to the north. Originally called Union Station because it served the Pennsylvania Railroad and Western Maryland Railway, it was renamed to match other Pennsylvania Stations in 1928.

The building sits on a raised "island" of sorts between two open trenches, one for the Jones Falls Expressway and the other the tracks of the Northeast Corridor (NEC). The NEC approaches from the south through the two-track, 7,660-foot Baltimore and Potomac Tunnel, which opened in 1873 and whose 30 mph limit, sharp curves, and steep grades make it one of the NEC's worst bottlenecks. The NEC's northern approach is the 1873 Union Tunnel, which has one single-track bore and one double-track bore.

Penn Station is the eighth-busiest Amtrak rail station in the United States by number of passengers served each year.

Services
The station is the northern terminus of the Baltimore Light RailLink's Penn–Camden shuttle, connecting the Mount Vernon neighborhood with downtown; the southern terminus is Baltimore's Camden Station. It is also a major station on MARC's Penn Line commuter service to Washington. Most Penn Line trains terminate here, with some continuing to Martin State Airport or Perryville.

Amtrak owns the station, which serves nine of Amtrak's Northeast Corridor services.  Acela Express and Northeast Regional trains from Penn Station serve destinations along the Northeast Corridor between Boston and Washington, D.C. Some Regional trains from the station continue into Virginia and serve Alexandria, Newport News, Norfolk, Roanoke, and points in between. Other long-distance trains from the station serve:

St. Albans, Vermont
Charlottesville, Virginia
Raleigh and Charlotte, North Carolina
Atlanta, Georgia
New Orleans, Louisiana
Jacksonville, Orlando, Tampa, and Miami, Florida
Huntington, West Virginia
Cincinnati, Ohio
Indianapolis, Indiana
Chicago, Illinois

Although Amtrak owns the station, its Superliner railcars cannot enter due to inadequate clearances in the B&P and Union tunnels.

In the 1970s and 1980s, Amtrak also offered service to Harrisburg and Pittsburgh, Pennsylvania, St. Louis, Missouri, and Atlantic City, New Jersey.

Before Amtrak's creation on May 1, 1971, Penn Station served as the main Baltimore station for its original owner, the Pennsylvania Railroad (PRR), though passenger trains of the Western Maryland Railway also used Penn Station as well. It was also served by numerous PRR commuter trains to Washington, the ancestor of the MARC Penn Line. Well-known streamliners of other railroads, such as the Southern Railway's "Southerner" and all-Pullman "Crescent Limited", the Atlantic Coast Line's "Champion", and the Seaboard's "Silver Meteor", were operated by the PRR between New York and Washington, stopping at Baltimore's Penn Station to board passengers destined for southern points served by those railroads.

Until the late 1960s, the PRR also operated long-distance trains over its historic Northern Central Railway line from Penn Station to Harrisburg and beyond, such as "The General" to Chicago, the "Spirit of St. Louis" to its Missouri namesake, and the "Buffalo Day Express" and overnight "Northern Express" between Washington, DC, and Buffalo, New York. As late as 1956, this route also hosted the "Liberty Limited" to Chicago and the "Dominion Limited" to Toronto, Canada.  The Baltimore Light RailLink now operates over much of the Northern Central Railway's right of way in Baltimore and Baltimore County; however, the spur connecting Penn Station to this right of way is not the route originally taken by Northern Central trains. Baltimore Light RailLink service began in 1997.

As part of the Northeast Corridor Improvement Project, the station was restored to its 1911 appearance in 1984.

The station's use as a Western Maryland station stop allowed passengers from Penn Station to ride directly to various Maryland towns such as Westminster, Hagerstown, and Cumberland. Passenger service on the Western Maryland ended in 1958.

Baltimore Penn Station is also used for MARC train storage during the weekends and overnight via off-peak service times on tracks 2, 3, 5, and 8.

Station services
Penn Station offers a magazine store that sells quick necessities, and two restaurants: Dunkin' Donuts and Java Moon Cafe. Parking is available at the station through a garage with 550 parking spaces, owned by the Baltimore Parking Authority. ZipCar also has three vehicles based at the station.

History

Pennsylvania Station opened on September 15, 1911. The present station is the third railroad depot on its North Charles Street site. The first one was a wooden structure built by the Northern Central Railway, a subsidiary of the PRR, that began operating in 1873. This was replaced in 1886 by the Charles Street Union Station, which featured a three-story brick building situated below street level with a sloping driveway that led to its entrance and a train shed that measured 76 by 360 feet (23.16 by 109.73 meters). It was demolished in January 1910, for construction of the present edifice.

In the 1920s-1940s, Savarin Restaurants provided full-service dining rooms at Baltimore's Pennsylvania Station and Washington's Union Station, among others.  The Savarin Restaurant, located at the west end of Baltimore's station, was originally decorated with Chesapeake Bay-themed murals and had an entrance and exterior signage directly fronting Charles Street. By the early 1960s, the Savarin had ended table service and offered counter-service only.

Penn Station has been the region's primary intercity railroad station since the Baltimore & Ohio Railroad ended all passenger service north of Baltimore in 1958, subsequently closing Mount Royal Station in 1961 and eventually reducing service at Camden Station to local commuter trains only by 1971.

Checkers speech 
During what became known as the Checkers speech, on September 23, 1952, Richard Nixon, then a U.S. Senator from California and the Republican Party's nominee for Vice President, cited Penn Station as the place where a package was waiting for him, containing a cocker spaniel dog his daughter Tricia would name "Checkers." Nixon referred to the station by its former name, "Union Station in Baltimore."

Male/Female sculpture controversy

In 2004, the City of Baltimore, through its public arts program, commissioned sculptor Jonathan Borofsky to create a sculpture as the centerpiece of a re-designed plaza in front of Penn Station. His work, a -tall aluminum statue entitled Male/Female, has generated considerable controversy ever since, with The Baltimore Sun reporting what it called a "maelstrom of criticism". Its defenders cite the contemporary imagery and artistic expression as complementing an urban landscape, while opponents criticize what they decry as a clash with the station's Beaux-Arts architecture and detracting from its classic lines. The Baltimore Sun editorially characterized it as "oversized, underdressed, and woefully out of place".

Development around station

Several proposals have been made to convert the upper floors of the station into a hotel. Proposals from 2001 and 2006 were announced but never completed. In 2009, Amtrak reached an agreement with a developer for a 77-room hotel to be called The Inn at Penn Station. This project stalled along with many other hotel proposals in Baltimore.

In December 2017, Amtrak awarded a contract to Penn Station Partners for improvements to the station and redevelopment of nearby property owned by the passenger railroad. The partnership is composed of Beatty Development Group and Cross Street Partners. In April 2019, it was announced that development would encompass a transit-oriented hub of apartments, shops, offices, a hotel, and redevelopment of nearby property owned by the passenger railroad. Amtrak describes the plan as creating a premier regional transportation hub to accommodate passenger growth as the next generation of high-speed Acela Express trains start running along the Northeast Corridor in 2021. A spokesman for Penn Station Partners stated at a presentation of its tentative plans to the public on August 13, 2019, that they will seek city and state funding to help pay the total  project cost. Included would be a new concourse and other station enhancements to accommodate the expected increase in passenger volume. Amtrak, for its part, has earmarked $90 million in federal funding for related improvements to the station and its tracks.

Amtrak and the Penn Station Partners development team headed by Beatty Development Group and Cross Street Partners unveiled plans to construct a three-level train terminal just north of the existing station on October 15, 2020. The new structure, which is meant to supplement the current building by accommodating all passenger-oriented functions with the expectation of increased traffic from the potential installation of a high-speed rail line, will be bordered by Charles Street to the west, Lanvale Street to the north, St. Paul Street to the east and the facility's railroad tracks to the south. The existing Penn Station's restoration began in 2021, with its upper levels converted into office space and restaurants and shops occupying the ground level.

In a June 8, 2021, editorial, the Baltimore Sun noted that the controversial Male/Female aluminum statue is not shown in the development team's conceptual drawings for the station plaza. The developers said no decision has been reached about its future and the newspaper called for public input on the issue.

References

External links

 , including undated photo, at Maryland Historical Trust
 Baltimore Penn Station (TrainWeb)
 Penn Station – Explore Baltimore Heritage
All of the following are filed under Baltimore, Independent City, MD:

Baltimore
Baltimore
Penn Line
Baltimore
Baltimore
MARC Train stations
Railway stations in the United States opened in 1911
Baltimore Light Rail stations
Beaux-Arts architecture in Maryland
Transit centers in the United States
Clock towers in Maryland
Railway stations on the National Register of Historic Places in Baltimore
Historic American Buildings Survey in Baltimore
Historic American Engineering Record in Baltimore
Railway stations in Baltimore
Baltimore City Landmarks